KRJT (105.9 FM, "Boomer Radio 95.3 & 105.9") is an American radio station licensed to serve the community of Elgin, Oregon. The station is owned by the Pacific Empire Radio Corporation. All five stations owned and operated by Pacific Empire Radio Corporation share a radio studio building in La Grande, Oregon, located at 2510 Cove Ave.

Programming
KRJT broadcasts an oldies music format to the greater La Grande, Oregon, area in simulcast with sister station KKBC-FM (95.3 FM) in Baker City, Oregon. The joint broadcast is branded as "Boomer Radio 95.3 & 105.9".

History
This station received its original construction permit for a new FM station broadcasting at 105.9 MHz from the Federal Communications Commission on March 25, 2005. The new station was assigned the call letters KRJT by the FCC on August 24, 2005. KRJT received its license to cover from the FCC on February 2, 2006.

Previous logo

References

External links

RJT
Oldies radio stations in the United States
Radio stations established in 2005
Union County, Oregon
2005 establishments in Oregon